Dame Elizabeth Anne Loosemore Esteve-Coll  (née Kingdon; born 14 October 1938) is a British academic and former museum director and librarian.

Career
The daughter of a Darlington bank clerk, she was educated at Darlington High School, Trinity College, Dublin and Birkbeck College, London.

Esteve-Coll was head of learning resources at Kingston Polytechnic from 1977, and in 1982 became the first female director of the University of Surrey Library. Esteve-Coll was the first woman director of a national arts collection when she was appointed as director of the Victoria and Albert Museum in 1987, succeeding Sir Roy Strong. She resigned in 1994, midway through her second term as director, to take up the Vice-Chancellorship of the University of East Anglia. Dr. Alan Borg succeeded her as its new director, taking the post on 1 October 1995.

Esteve-Coll served as Vice-Chancellor of the University of East Anglia from 1995 to 1997, but was forced to step down after being diagnosed with multiple sclerosis. She said at the time: "It is with real sadness and disappointment that I must acknowledge that I am not able to lead the university into the 21st century." She served as Chancellor of University of Lincoln for seven years, as well as being a Trustee of the Sainsbury Institute for the Study of Japanese Arts and Cultures since its foundation in Jan 1999.

Honours
Esteve-Coll received the Order of the Rising Sun, Gold Rays with Neck Ribbon in November 2005 in recognition of her "outstanding contribution to the promotion of Japanese culture and studies to British people".
In November 2008, she was presented with an honorary doctorate of arts and the title chancellor emerita during her farewell ceremony at Lincoln Cathedral.

Bibliography
 Books by My Bedside (1989)

References

External links
 IFLA Section of Art Libraries Annual Report — September 1997 – August 1998
 Interview with Dame Elizabeth Esteve-Coll
 Elizabeth Esteve-Coll on Desert Island Discs

1938 births
Living people
English writers
Alumni of Birkbeck, University of London
Alumni of Trinity College Dublin
Dames Commander of the Order of the British Empire
Directors of the Victoria and Albert Museum
Vice-Chancellors of the University of East Anglia
People associated with the University of Lincoln
People from Darlington
People with multiple sclerosis
People associated with the Victoria and Albert Museum
English librarians
British women librarians
Women museum directors